The New South Wales Minister for the Environment and Heritage is minister in the Government of New South Wales with responsibilities which included environmental regulation and policy, national parks, and the conservation and protection of built and environmental heritage in New South Wales, Australia. The current minister, since 21 December 2021, is James Griffin.

Between the 2019 state election and December 2021, the ministerial post was merged with the Energy and Utilities portfolio to create the Minister for Energy and Environment.

The minister administers the portfolio through the Planning and Environment cluster, in particular the Department of Planning and Environment, the Office of the Environment and Heritage, and a range of other government agencies.

Ultimately, the minister is responsible to the Parliament of New South Wales.

List of ministers

Former ministerial titles

Conservation

References

External links 
Office of Environment and Heritage

Energy
Environment of New South Wales
Environment ministers